Alexander Bruce Doull (born 11 September 1950) is a former Australian rules footballer who played for the Carlton Football Club in the Victorian Football League (VFL).

Wearing guernsey number 11, he was nicknamed the "Flying Doormat" due to the matted appearance of the constantly disarranged long portions of his extreme "combover" hairstyle. He was recruited from Jacana at the age of 19 as a half-back flanker.  Doull was a safe mark, a dependable kick, and a footballer who rarely made a mistake.

Doull, shy and extremely reserved, did not give interviews; instead, he always preferred to stay in the background. He won Carlton's Best & Fairest in 1974, 1977, 1980, and 1984; played in four Carlton premiership sides: 1972, 1979, 1981, and 1982; won the Norm Smith Medal in 1981; and also played in the losing Grand Finals of 1973 and 1986. Doull was also a regular State of Origin representative. In 2009, The Australian nominated Doull as one of the 25 greatest footballers never to win a Brownlow Medal.

He is often remembered as being harassed by Carlton scarf–wearing streaker Helen D'Amico in the 1982 Grand Final between Carlton and Richmond.  This incident was the focus of an instalment of the Toyota Memorable Moments advertisement (with D'Amico appearing at the end), and is captured in Jamie Cooper's painting The Game That Made Australia, commissioned by the AFL in 2008 to celebrate the 150th anniversary of the sport. Doull and D'Amico posed for a photo together 25 years later, making it clear they had long since settled their disagreements.

Doull's trademark was his greying beard and the navy blue and white headband which kept his thinning long hair in place. Never reported by the umpires for foul play, he was noted for his determination to play the ball rather than the man, which was rare in an era of occasionally brutal clashes. Brent Crosswell wrote: "Doull's game has a moral purity about it, and that is why opponents have always found it extremely difficult to be unfair to him. It would have shamed them."

Only once did he lose his temper. In a match against Hawthorn, he was tackled around the neck by Kevin Ablett. Bruce chased after Ablett, with the commentator saying "Bruce Doull has gone berserk". Contrary to stories told, he did not have his headband stolen in that incident. The game where his headband was removed was against Essendon in 1983, late in his career. A frustrated Cameron Clayton snatched off his ancient, faded headband and his team-mate Tony Buhagiar ended up with it and threw it into the crowd at VFL Park. Contrary to stories told, he did not go berserk in this incident. These two incidents were in effect combined and recreated in his Toyota Memorable Moments advertisement, except that he remained his usual docile self when he was supposed to lose his temper.

By the end of his career, he had played 356 games – then a club record – and since surpassed only by Craig Bradley. Doull holds the current club record for most consecutive games played, with 162 matches played between 1971 and 1978; he actually missed two club games due to representing Victoria in interstate matches during this streak, but the AFL has formally included such games within a player's consecutive games streak following an amendment to its interpretation in December 2012. Doull kicked just 22 goals over his 18-year career.

Statistics

|- style=background:#EAEAEA
| scope=row | 1969 ||  || 4
| 6 || 2 || 0 || 42 || 24 || 66 || 14 ||  || 0.3 || 0.0 || 7.0 || 4.0 || 11.0 || 2.3 ||  || 0
|-
| scope=row | 1970 ||  || 4
| 9 || 0 || 1 || 94 || 29 || 123 || 12 ||  || 0.0 || 0.1 || 10.4 || 3.2 || 13.7 || 1.3 ||  || 0
|- style=background:#EAEAEA
| scope=row | 1971 ||  || 4
| 12 || 0 || 0 || 107 || 32 || 139 || 29 ||  || 0.0 || 0.0 || 8.9 || 2.7 || 11.6 || 2.4 ||  || 0
|-
| scope=row bgcolor=F0E68C | 1972# ||  || 11
| 26 || 1 || 0 || 315 || 94 || 409 || 69 ||  || 0.0 || 0.0 || 12.1 || 3.6 || 15.7 || 2.7 ||  || 5
|- style=background:#EAEAEA
| scope=row | 1973 ||  || 11
| 25 || 1 || 0 || 258 || 136 || 394 || 74 ||  || 0.0 || 0.0 || 10.3 || 5.4 || 15.8 || 3.0 ||  || 0
|-
| scope=row | 1974 ||  || 11
| 22 || 0 || 1 || 233 || 105 || 338 || 76 ||  || 0.0 || 0.0 || 10.6 || 4.8 || 15.4 || 3.5 ||  || 1
|- style=background:#EAEAEA
| scope=row | 1975 ||  || 11
| 24 || 1 || 2 || 252 || 92 || 344 || 63 ||  || 0.0 || 0.1 || 11.0 || 4.0 || 15.0 || 2.7 ||  || 2
|-
| scope=row | 1976 ||  || 11
| 23 || 0 || 1 || 235 || 97 || 332 || 64 ||  || 0.0 || 0.0 || 10.2 || 4.2 || 14.4 || 2.8 ||  || 18
|- style=background:#EAEAEA
| scope=row | 1977 ||  || 11
| 21 || 1 || 0 || 233 || 106 || 339 || 93 ||  || 0.0 || 0.0 || 11.1 || 5.0 || 16.1 || 4.4 ||  || 34
|-
| scope=row | 1978 ||  || 11
| 21 || 6 || 3 || 181 || 169 || 350 || 73 ||  || 0.3 || 0.1 || 8.6 || 8.0 || 16.7 || 3.5 ||  || 8
|- style=background:#EAEAEA
| scope=row bgcolor=F0E68C | 1979# ||  || 11
| 21 || 3 || 4 || 174 || 202 || 376 || 69 ||  || 0.1 || 0.2 || 8.3 || 9.6 || 17.9 || 3.3 ||  || 5
|-
| scope=row | 1980 ||  || 11
| 22 || 2 || 3 || 182 || 217 || 399 || 68 ||  || 0.1 || 0.1 || 8.3 || 9.9 || 18.1 || 3.1 ||  || 5
|- style=background:#EAEAEA
| scope=row bgcolor=F0E68C | 1981# ||  || 11
| 24 || 3 || 3 || 225 || 168 || 393 || 70 ||  || 0.1 || 0.1 || 9.4 || 7.0 || 16.4 || 2.9 ||  || 9
|-
| scope=row bgcolor=F0E68C | 1982# ||  || 11
| 26 || 2 || 5 || 208 || 195 || 403 || 86 ||  || 0.1 || 0.2 || 8.0 || 7.5 || 15.5 || 3.3 || || 5
|- style=background:#EAEAEA
| scope=row | 1983 ||  || 11
| 22 || 0 || 1 || 180 || 140 || 320 || 56 ||  || 0.0 || 0.0 || 8.2 || 6.4 || 14.5 || 2.5 ||  || 2
|-
| scope=row | 1984 ||  || 11
| 24 || 0 || 0 || 188 || 93 || 281 || 65 ||  || 0.0 || 0.0 || 7.8 || 3.9 || 11.7 || 2.7 ||  || 7
|- style=background:#EAEAEA
| scope=row | 1985 ||  || 11
| 3 || 0 || 0 || 23 || 9 || 32 || 4 ||  || 0.0 || 0.0 || 7.7 || 3.0 || 10.7 || 1.3 ||  || 3
|-
| scope=row | 1986 ||  || 11
| 25 || 0 || 0 || 174 || 86 || 260 || 49 ||  || 0.0 || 0.0 || 7.0 || 3.4 || 10.4 || 2.0 ||  || 4
|- class=sortbottom
! colspan=3 | Career
! 356 !! 22 !! 24 !! 3304 !! 1994 !! 5298 !! 1034 !!  !! 0.1 !! 0.1 !! 9.3 !! 5.6 !! 14.9 !! 2.9 !!  !! 108
|}

Honours and achievements
Team
 4× VFL premiership player: 1972, 1979, 1981, 1982
 2× McClelland Trophy: 1969, 1979

Individual
 Norm Smith Medal: 1981
 All-Australian team: 1979
 4× John Nicholls Medal: 1974, 1977, 1980, 1984
 State of Origin (Victoria): 1984
 Australian Football League Team of the Century 1897-1996
 Carlton Team of the Century 1897-1996

References

External links

Norm Smith Medal winners
1950 births
Living people
Australian people of Scottish descent
All-Australians (1953–1988)
Australian Football Hall of Fame inductees
Carlton Football Club players
Carlton Football Club Premiership players
Victorian State of Origin players
John Nicholls Medal winners
Australian rules footballers from Geelong
Jacana Football Club players
Four-time VFL/AFL Premiership players